Qaleh Joqeh (also Romanized as Qal‘eh Joqeh; also known as Qal‘eh Jūqeh) is a village in Obatu Rural District, Karaftu District, Divandarreh County, Kurdistan Province, Iran. At the 2006 census, its population was 497, in 108 families. The village is populated by Kurds.

References 

Towns and villages in Divandarreh County
Kurdish settlements in Kurdistan Province